Maliau Basin or also Maliau Basin Conservation Area, is a region in Tongod District of Sabah, Malaysia, which represents a geological catchment surrounding the Maliau River. Located around the centre of Sabah in the Sandakan Division, it was designated as a conservation area by the Sabah Foundation (Yayasan Sabah) in 1981. Later in 1997 the Sabah State Assembly gazetted the Basin as a Protection Forest Reserve (Class I) with a total area of 588 square kilometres. The region also features Mount Lotung (1667 metres), Maliau Falls, and Lake Linumunsut. Efforts are underway to nominate the area as a World Heritage Site.
In 2011, the Maliau Basin Studies Centre opened, a large field centre to serve as a basis for studies and teaching carried out in Maliau by naturalists, biologists, and groups of field course students (e.g., Sheffield University, Griffith University, Otago University, and the citizen-science organisation Taxon Expeditions).

References

External links 

 Official website of the conservation area
 Information on Maliau Basin
 Information from Wild Asia
 NusantaraKu Maliau Basin Sabah's lost world

1981 establishments in Malaysia
Forest reserves of Sabah
Protected areas established in 1981
Tongod District
Borneo montane rain forests
Borneo lowland rain forests